Automeris io, the Io moth or peacock moth, is a colorful North American moth in the family Saturniidae. The io moth is also a member of the subfamily Hemileucinae. The name Io comes from Greek mythology in which Io was a mortal lover of Zeus. The Io moth ranges from the southeast corner of Manitoba and in the southern extremes of Ontario, Quebec, New Brunswick and Nova Scotia in Canada, and in the US it is found from Montana, North Dakota, South Dakota, Nebraska, Colorado, New Mexico, Texas, Utah, east of those states and down to the southern end of Florida. The species was first described by Johan Christian Fabricius in 1775.

Adult description

Imagines (sexually mature, reproductive stage) have a wingspan of 2.5–3.5 inches (63–88 mm). This species is sexually dimorphic: males have bright yellow forewings, body, and legs, while females have reddish-brown to purple forewings, body, and legs. The males also have much bigger plumose (feathery) antennae than the females. Both males and females have one big black to bluish eyespot with some white in the center, on each hindwing. Some hybridizations have resulted in variations in these hindwing eyespots. Adults live 1–2 weeks.

Parasitoids 
Many species of flies (Tachinidae) and wasps (Ichneumonidae and Braconidae) are known parasitoids. The flies include the introduced Compsilura concinnata, Lespesia sabroskyi Chetogena claripennis, Carcelia formosa, Sisyropa eudryae, Lespesia frenchii, and Nilea dimmocki. The wasps include the Ichneumonidae species Hyposoter fugitivus and Enicospilus americanus  and the Braconidae species Cotesia electrae and Cotesia hemileucae.

Predators 
Io moths have many predators. These include birds, small mammals, and spiders.

Defenses 
There are two hypotheses regarding where this venom originates: (1) the glandular cells on the base of the branched seta or (2) from the secretory epithelial cells. Contacting the seta is not life-threatening for humans, but still causes irritation to the dermal tissue, thought to result in a stinging sensation.
Both male and female adult io moths utilize their hindwing eyespots in predatory defense when the moth is sitting in the head-down position or is touched, via shaking and exposing these eyespots.

Life cycle
Females lay small, white ova in the leaves of host plants, including:

 Morus  alba-mulberry

 Prunus pensylvanica—pin cherry 
 Salix—willow 
 Abies balsamea—balsam fir
 Acer rubrum—red maple
 Amorpha fruticosa—bastard indigo
 Baptisia tinctoria—wild indigo
 Carpinus caroliniana—American hornbeam
 Celtis laevigata—sugarberry or southern hackberry
 Cephalanthus occidentalis—button-bush
 Cercis canadensis—eastern redbud
 Chamaecrista fasciculata—showy partridge pea
 Comptonia peregrina—sweetfern
 Cornus florida—flowering dogwood
 Corylus avellana—common hazel
 Erythrina herbacea, coral bean
 Fagus—beech
 Fraxinus—ash
 Liquidambar styraciflua—American sweetgum
 Lythrum salicaria, introduced Purple Loosestrife
 Quercus—oak
 Paeonia—peony
 Phoenix roebelenii

The eggs have large micropyle rosettes that turn black as the fertile eggs develop. They are usually laid in clusters of more than twenty and hatch within 8–11 days. From the eggs, orange larvae emerge, usually eating their egg shell soon after hatching. They go through five instars, each one being a little different.
The caterpillars are herbivorous and gregarious in all their instars, many times traveling in single file processions all over the food plant. As the larvae develop, they will lose their orange color and will turn bright green and urticating, having many spines. The green caterpillars have two lateral stripes, the upper one being bright red and the lower one being white. These caterpillars can reach sizes of 7 cm in length. When the caterpillars are ready, they spin a flimsy, valveless cocoon made from a dark, coarse silk. Some larvae will crawl to the base of the tree and make their cocoons among leaf litter on the ground, while others will use living leaves to wrap their cocoons with. The leaves will turn brown and fall to the ground during fall, taking the cocoons with them. There they pupate, the pupa being dark brown/black. The pupae also have sexual dimorphism with the females being considerably larger than the males.

Adult io moths normally emerge from their cocoons in late morning or early afternoon. The emergence of the adults moths is typically from June to July. Eclosion (emergence from the cocoon) only takes a few minutes. After eclosing, the moths climb and hang on plants so that their furled wings can be inflated with fluid (hemolymph) pumped from the body. This inflation process takes about twenty minutes.
Adult moths are strictly nocturnal, generally flying during the peak hours of the night. The females generally wait until nightfall and then extend a scent gland from the posterior region of the abdomen, in order to attract males via wind-borne pheromones. The males use their larger antennae to detect the pheromones. After mating, the females die following egg laying. These moths have vestigial mouthparts and do not eat in the adult stage.

Conservation Status 
The io moth is currently not listed on the IUCN Red List or the US Federal List. In the eastern range of the US, the populations indicate a declining and more localized trend.

See also
 Aglais io, a butterfly species

References

External links

Site with a description and pictures
Io moth on the UF / IFAS Featured Creatures Web site

Hemileucinae
Moths of North America
Moths described in 1775
Taxa named by Johan Christian Fabricius